Rádio Top 100 Oficiální is the official chart of the top ranking songs as based on airplay in the Czech Republic, compiled and published weekly by IFPI Czech Republic.

From 2003 through 2010, the song that spend the most weeks at number one was "Say It Right" by Nelly Furtado. The artist with the most number ones during that time frame was Chinaski with five.

Number-one songs

See also 
2000s in music
List of number-one songs of the 2000s (Slovakia)

References

Czech Republic
2000s